Smedley-Aston is the surname of:
Brian Smedley-Aston, editor of The Shuttered Room
Michael Smedley-Aston (1912–2006), British film producer, son of William Smedley-Aston
William Smedley-Aston (1868–1941), British photographer and artist

See also
Smedley (disambiguation)
Aston (name)

Compound surnames
English-language surnames
Surnames of English origin